Soft Swells is a Los Angeles band composed primarily of singer/songwriter Tim Williams, formerly signed to the Modern Outsider record label.

References

Musical groups from Los Angeles
American musical duos